Eogaleus is an extinct genus of requiem shark from the Eocene epoch. It contains a single species, E. bolcensis. It is known from multiple articulated individuals from the Bolca Konservat−Lagerstätte of the Ypresian of Italy. It was a shallow water species.

References

Eocene sharks
Carcharhinidae
Prehistoric shark genera